Xunyang River is a section of Yangtze River north of Jiujiang, Jiangxi province, China.

Jiujiang had ancient names like Chaisang and Xunyang, thus the section of Yangtze River passing Jiujiang was thus named. Today, there is a district called Xunyang District in Jiujiang.

Rivers of Jiangxi